is an anime that began airing on April 9, 2009 on Fuji TV. It was created, directed and written by Kenji Kamiyama. The opening theme is "Falling Down" by English rock band Oasis, while the ending theme is "futuristic imagination" by Japanese band School Food Punishment.

Episode list

External links

Eden of the East